There are many different types of environmental issues in Canada which include air and water pollution, climate change, mining and logging. Environmental issues based in Canada are discussed in further detail below.

Climate change

Melting of the Arctic and its effects on marine ecosystems
Scientists across the world have already started to notice massive reductions in Canada's Arctic sea ice cover, particularly during the summertime. The shrinking of this ice results in the disruption of the ocean circulation, and changes in climate and weather around the world.

 The 2019 Canada's Changing Climate Report, written by scientists from institutions around the globe, states that the impacts of climate change on Atlantic Canada will be very diverse. One impact is that the sea ice will become thinner and will also form for much shorter periods of the year. And with less sea ice than the region usually gets now, wave seasons will become more intense. Atlantic Canada will see a relative rise in sea levels everywhere - a rise which is estimated to be 75 to 100 cm by the year 2100. Scientists also predict that even if emissions decrease, a 20-cm rise is expected to take place during the course of the next 20 to 30 years.
As the ocean warms and subtropical waters move north, the ocean will become warmer and saltier, and since warmer water holds less oxygen than cooler water, marine ecosystems can suffer and become less sustainable because of this lower oxygen level.
In the journal, Science, which was published in March 2019, it explains that warmer waters could actually increase fish stocks in certain regions, like the halibut found off the coast of Newfoundland and Greenland but other species such as the Atlantic Cod and albacore tuna might not be able to cope with the conditions so well.

Conservation

The Rainforest Action Network and indigenous groups have campaigned to protect the boreal forest of Canada from logging and mining. In July 2008 the Ontario government announced plans to protect some of the area from all industrial activity.

Logging
Logging of old growth forest continues in Canada. The Ancient Forest Alliance is an environmental group in British Columbia, dedicated to stopping logging in endangered old growth forests, and ensuring the sustainable logging of second growth forests.

The forests of Clayoquot Sound are still being logged. There are ongoing protests over the logging and in 1993 it was the site of the largest act of peaceful civil disobedience in Canada.

Pollution

Air pollution

Chemical pollution
The Aamjiwnaang First Nation community has expressed concern regarding its proximity to chemical plants, as birth rates of their people have been documented by the American journal Environmental Health Perspectives as deviating from the normal ratio of close to 50% boys, 50% girls. The ratio as found between 1999 and 2003 by the journal was roughly 33% boys, and 67% girls. The First Nation is concerned that this abnormal trend is due to adverse effects of maternal and fetal exposure to the effluent and emissions of the nearby chemical plants. This is the first community in the world to have a birth rate of two girls to every boy.

Mining pollution 
Canada, like most other countries with significant 
Environmental impact of the Athabasca oil sands
Cleanup of the Colomac Mine
Acid mine drainage from the Northland Pyrite Mine
Mary River Mine environmental concerns

Plastic pollution 
In the year 2022 Canada announced a ban on producing and importing single use plastic from December 2022. The sale of those items will be banned from December 2023 and the export from 2025. The prime minister of Canada Justin Trudeau pledged to ban single use plastic in 2019. As for now in Canada "Up to 15 billion plastic checkout bags are used each year and approximately 16 million straws are used every day"

See also
Environment of Canada
Environmental policy of the Harper government
Environmental racism
Hard Choices: Climate Change in Canada
List of environmental issues
Pollution in Canada
RAVEN (Respecting Aboriginal Values & Environmental Needs)
Carbon pricing in Canada

References

External links 

 Environment and Climate Change Canada

 
Environmental issues